ARNT may refer to:
 Arnt (given name), a masculine given name
 Aryl hydrocarbon receptor nuclear translocator, a human gene
 Lipid IVA 4-amino-4-deoxy-L-arabinosyltransferase, an enzyme class